Justo Wilmar Villar Viveros (born 30 June 1977) is a Paraguayan former professional footballer who played as a goalkeeper.

Other than in his own country, he also played in Argentina, Spain and Chile, in a senior career that lasted 22 years.

A Paraguay international on 120 occasions, Villar represented the nation in three World Cups and seven Copa América tournaments.

Club career
Born in Cerrito, Ñeembucú Department, Villar started his career at Club Sol de América where he was coached by legendary Ever Hugo Almeida, also a goalkeeper, as the team also included another player in that position as their coach, Modesto Sandoval.

In 2001, he moved to Club Libertad, where he was reunited with Sandoval: he won back-to-back Paraguayan Primera División titles with the side, in 2002 and 2003, signing the following year with Argentina's Newell's Old Boys.

As an undisputed starter, Villar helped Newell's to the 2004 Apertura championship, also being considered by the press as the Goalkeeper of the Year – previously, he had won the Paraguayan Footballer of the Year award (2004).

In January 2008, terms were agreed upon between Newell's and Real Valladolid of Spain for Villar's transfer, effective in the summer. On 14 July, he was officially presented by his new club; due to starter Sergio Asenjo's injury, he was able to appear in 15 La Liga matches in his first year.

During the 2009–10 season, Villar constantly battled for first-choice status with Jacobo, featuring in 23 games as the Castile and León side returned to Segunda División after a three-year stay. He was released in June 2011 at the age of 34, mainly due to his high salary.

The following month, Villar moved back to Argentina and signed a three-year deal with Estudiantes de La Plata. In 2013 he returned to his homeland, joining Club Nacional.

Villar changed clubs and countries again on 18 June 2013, after agreeing to a one-and-a-half-year contract with Colo-Colo in the Chilean Primera División. He helped them win the Clausura in his debut campaign, as first-choice.

Ater one season with Asunción-based Club Nacional, Villar announced his retirement from professional football at age 41, adding he wished to remain active in the sport.

International career
Villar represented Paraguay at the 1997 FIFA World Youth Championship, and received his first cap for the full side two years later. He also appeared with the under-23s at the 2000 CONMEBOL Men Pre-Olympic Tournament, making four appearances.

Having been selected for the 2002 FIFA World Cup, backing up José Luis Chilavert, Villar was already a starter in the 2006 edition, but had a brief participation: during the first seven minutes of the opener against England, just after Carlos Gamarra's own goal, he got injured, was replaced by Aldo Bobadilla and subsequently sidelined for the rest of the tournament, in which the national team was eliminated in the first round.

In the 2010 FIFA World Cup in South Africa, Villar played all the matches for the eventual quarter-finalists and only conceded two goals, against Italy in the group stage (1–1) and Spain in the last-eight match (0–1, also saving a Xabi Alonso penalty), and was selected as captain. During the 2011 Copa América he was again first-choice and captain, and helped his team reach the final, notably saving a penalty in the quarter-finals shootout against Brazil (0–0 after 120 minutes); he was named the Best Goalkeeper for his displays during the competition, keeping clean sheets in three games.

Villar played four games in the 2015 Copa América, helping Paraguay to the fourth place in Chile.

Career statistics

Honours
Libertad
Paraguayan Primera División: 2002, 2003

Newell's Old Boys
Argentine Primera División: 2004 Apertura

Colo-Colo
Campeonato Nacional (Chile): 2014 Clausura, 2015 Apertura 
Copa Chile: runner-up 2015

Paraguay
Copa América: runner-up 2011

Individual
Paraguayan Footballer of the Year: 2004
Copa América: Best Goalkeeper 2011

See also
List of men's footballers with 100 or more international caps
 Players and Records in Paraguayan Football

References

External links

1977 births
Living people
People from Ñeembucú Department
Paraguayan footballers
Association football goalkeepers
Paraguayan Primera División players
Club Sol de América footballers
Club Libertad footballers
Club Nacional footballers
Argentine Primera División players
Newell's Old Boys footballers
Estudiantes de La Plata footballers
La Liga players
Segunda División players
Real Valladolid players
Chilean Primera División players
Colo-Colo footballers
Paraguay under-20 international footballers
Paraguay international footballers
1999 Copa América players
2001 Copa América players
2002 FIFA World Cup players
2004 Copa América players
2006 FIFA World Cup players
2007 Copa América players
2010 FIFA World Cup players
2011 Copa América players
2015 Copa América players
Copa América Centenario players
Paraguayan expatriate footballers
Expatriate footballers in Argentina
Expatriate footballers in Spain
Expatriate footballers in Chile
Paraguayan expatriate sportspeople in Argentina
Paraguayan expatriate sportspeople in Spain
Paraguayan expatriate sportspeople in Chile
FIFA Century Club